Aldo Boni (11 March 1895 – 1982) was an Italian fencer. He competed at the 1920 and 1924 Summer Olympics.

References

1895 births
1982 deaths
Italian male fencers
Olympic fencers of Italy
Fencers at the 1920 Summer Olympics
Fencers at the 1924 Summer Olympics